The Xuanren Temple (宣仁庙/宣仁廟) is a Taoist temple in Beijing, China. Located in the Dongcheng District, it was built in 1728 during the Qing Dynasty.

References

External links
 

Dongcheng District, Beijing
Taoist temples in Beijing